Fix Yourself, Not the World is the fifth studio album by English rock band the Wombats, released on 14 January 2022. It was preceded by the singles "Method to the Madness", "If You Ever Leave, I'm Coming with You", "Ready for the High", and "Everything I Love Is Going to Die". Music videos were also released for the tracks "This Car Drives All By Itself" and "Worry". The album was supported by a tour throughout America, Europe, and Australia during 2022.

Background and recording
The album began when all members were together in Los Angeles in 2019 and wrote several songs. It was then recorded remotely during several COVID-19 lockdowns beginning in 2020, with each band member in a different location: Matthew Murphy in Los Angeles, bassist Tord Øverland Knudsen in Oslo and drummer Dan Haggis in London. They made a plan each day before separately recording their parts and sending them on to the producers. Haggis said that the band "explored new genres and pushed ourselves further than ever musically" on the album.

Cover art
The cover art for the album and its singles was created by German–American pixel art collective eBoy. Kai Vermehr of eBoy said that he "collected loose ideas" from Murphy and the other band members, and the artwork came together without having "a detailed plan" but through "more of a discovery process".

Critical reception

At Metacritic, which assigns a normalised rating out of 100 to reviews from professional publications, the album received an average score of 70, based on 7 reviews, indicating "generally positive" reviews. Aggregator AnyDecentMusic? gave it 6.8 out of 10, based on their assessment of the critical consensus.

Track listing

Personnel
 Greg Calbi – mastering
 Steve Fallone – mastering
 Mike Crossey – mixing
 Gabe Simon – engineering
 Jack Duxbury – engineering
 Jacknife Lee – engineering
 Jonas Jalhay – engineering
 Mark Crew – engineering
 Paul Meany – engineering
 The Wombats – engineering
 Kai Vermehr – cover illustration
 Steffen Sauerteig – cover illustration
 Svend Smital – cover illustration
 Anthony Kitson – graphic design
 Stephen Sesso – assistance

Charts

References

2022 albums
Albums produced by Jacknife Lee
AWAL albums
The Wombats albums